Rich Mountain is roughly  south-southwest of Boone, in Moses H. Cone Memorial Park.  Its elevation reaches .  Because it's within the Blue Ridge Parkway, it is protected from development.  From 1922-1985, Camp Yonahlossee (Cherokee for "Trail of the Bear") was located at the western side of the mountain, it was one of the oldest all girls camp in North Carolina; today it is a resort and club.

The mountain generates several feeder streams to the South Fork New River (via Winkler Creek) and the Watauga River (via Cannon Branch).

References

External links
 Rich Mountain on Peakbagger.

Mountains of North Carolina
Mountains of Watauga County, North Carolina